The Rowley River is a small river between Ipswich and Rowley, Massachusetts.

The river lies within the estuary of Plum Island Sound, and is formed by the confluence of the Egypt River and Muddy Run in Ipswich, with numerous tributaries in the estuary.

Rowley River is navigable for small craft, and home to bass, shad and alewives. Its banks are lined with tidal salt marshes, and abound in clams. Today the river is popular for kayaking and lobstering.

References 
  Sammel, Edward A., Water resources of the Parker and Rowley River basins, Massachusetts, USGS Hydrologic Atlas HA-247, 1967.
 USGS Parker River Drainage Basin

Rivers of Essex County, Massachusetts
Rowley, Massachusetts
Rivers of Massachusetts